Sarcopterygii or the lobe-finned fishes (coelacanths and lungfishes) were usually classified as either a class or a subclass of Osteichthyes based on the traditional Linnaean classification. Identification of the group is based on several characteristics, such as the presence of fleshy, lobed, paired fins, which are joined to the body by a single bone.

Taxonomic and fossil history
The properties defining the sarcopterygians are in contrast to the other group of bony fish, the Actinopterygii, which have ray-fins made of bony rods, called  lepidotrichia.
These two bony fish groups were classified together as Osteichthyes at one time, the whole combined group was seen as the sister group to the tetrapods (mammals, birds, reptiles, and amphibians).

The extensive fossil record and numerous morphological and molecular studies have shown, however, that lungfish and some fossil lobe-finned fish are more closely related to tetrapods than they are to coelacanths; as a result tetrapods are nested within Sarcopterygii. This abides to cladistics in that in order for a clade to be monophyletic, it must have an ancestral species and all descendants of that common ancestor based on shared characteristics. As such mammals, birds and reptiles, and amphibians are highly derived lobe-finned fish despite looking nothing like the standard sarcopterygian anatomically speaking.

Current taxonomy
The list below shows the taxonomy of the extant members of class Sarcopterygii at the ordinal level. While this does reflect the evolutionary relationships within the group, it also retains the rankings seen in the Linnaean classification as suggested by some scientists. The evolutionary sequences are based from current phylogenetic work on the various subclades.

Class Sarcopterygii Romer, 1955
Subclass Actinistia Cope, 1871
Order Coelacanthiformes Berg, 1937
Subclass Rhipidistia Cope, 1871
Infraclass Dipnoi Müller, 1844
Order Ceratodontiformes Berg, 1940
Order Lepidosireniformes Müller, 1844
Infraclass Tetrapoda Goodrich, 1930
Parvclass Lissamphibia Haeckel, 1866
Order Apoda Oppel, 1811
Order Urodela Duméril, 1806
Order Anura Duméril, 1806
Parvclass Sauria Macartney, 1802
Cohort Lepidosauria Haeckel, 1866
Order Rhynchocephalia Günther, 1867
Order Squamata Oppel, 1811
Cohort Testudinata Klein, 1760
Order Testudines Batsch, 1788
Cohort Archosauria Cope, 1869
Order Crocodylia Owen, 1842
Subcohort Aves Linnaeus, 1758
Infracohort Palaeognathae Pycraft, 1900
Order Struthioniformes Latham, 1790
Order Rheiformes Forbes, 1884
Order Tinamiformes Huxley, 1872
†Order Dinornithiformes Bonaparte, 1853
†Order Aepyornithiformes Newton, 1884
Order Apterygiformes Haeckel, 1866
Order Casuariiformes Sclater 1880
Infracohort Neognathae Pycraft, 1900
Section Galloanserae Sclater, 1880
Order Anseriformes Wagler, 1831
Order Galliformes Temminck, 1820
Section Neoaves Sibley et al., 1988
Subsection Mirandornithes Sangster, 2005
Order Phoenicopteriformes Fürbringer, 1888
Order Podicipediformes Fürbringer, 1888
Subdivision Gruimorphae Bonaparte, 1854
Order Gruiformes Bonaparte, 1854
Order Charadriiformes Huxley, 1867
Subsection Columbaves Prum et al., 2015
Order Musophagiformes Seebohm, 1890
Order Cuculiformes Wagler, 1830
Order Otidiformes Wagler, 1830
Order Columbiformes Latham, 1790
Order Pterocliformes Huxley, 1868
Order Mesitornithiformes Wetmore, 1960
Order Opisthocomiformes L'Herminier, 1837
Subsection Strisores Baird, 1858
Order Steatornithiformes Sharpe, 1891
Order Nyctibiiformes Sharpe, 1891
Order Caprimulgiformes Ridgway, 1881
Order Podargiformes Sharpe, 1891
Order Aegotheliformes Simonetta, 1967
Order Apodiformes Peters, 1940
Subsection Ardeae Wagler, 1830
Order Phaethontiformes Sharpe, 1891
Order Eurypygiformes Fürbringer, 1888
Order Gaviiformes Wetmore & Miller, 1926
Order Sphenisciformes Sharpe, 1891
Order Procellariiformes Fürbringer, 1888
Order Ciconiiformes Bonaparte, 1854
Order Suliformes Sharpe, 1891
Order Pelecaniformes Sharpe, 1891
Subsection Telluraves Yuri et al., 2013
Division Afroaves Ericson, 2012
Order Cathartiformes Coues, 1884
Order Accipitriformes Vieillot, 1816
Order Strigiformes Wagler, 1830
Order Coliiformes Murie, 1872
Order Leptosomiformes Sharpe, 1991
Order Trogoniformes AOU, 1886
Order Bucerotiformes Fürbringer, 1888
Order Coraciiformes Forbes, 1884
Order Piciformes Meyer & Wolf, 1810
Division Australaves Ericson, 2012
Order Cariamiformes Fürbringer, 1888
Order Falconiformes Sharpe, 1874
Order Psittaciformes Wagler, 1830
Order Passeriformes Linnaeus, 1758
Parvclass Mammalia Linnaeus, 1758
Order Monotremata Bonaparte, 1837
Supercohort Theria Parker & Haswell, 1897
Cohort Marsupialia Illiger, 1811
Order Didelphimorphia Gill, 1872
Order Paucituberculata Trouessart, 1898
Subcohort Australidelphia Szalay, 1982
Order Microbiotheria Ameghino, 1889
Order Diprotodontia Owen, 1866
Order Notoryctemorphia Kirsch, 1977
Order Dasyuromorphia Gill, 1872
Order Peramelemorphia Ameghino, 1889
Cohort Placentalia Owen, 1837
Subcohort Atlantogenata Waddell, Okada & Hasegawa, 1999
Infracohort Xenarthra Cope, 1889
Order Cingulata Illiger, 1811
Order Pilosa Flower, 1883
Infracohort Afrotheria Stanhope et al., 1998
Order Afrosoricida Stanhope et al., 1998
Order Macroscelidea Butler, 1956
Order Tubulidentata Huxley, 1872
Order Hyracoidea Huxley, 1869
Order Sirenia Illiger, 1811
Order Proboscidea Illiger, 1810
Subcohort Boreoeutheria Springer & de Jong, 2001
Infracohort Laurasiatheria Waddell, Okada & Hasegawa, 1999
Order Eulipotyphla Douady et al., 2002
Order Chiroptera Blumenbach, 1779
Order Pholidota Weber, 1904
Order Carnivora Bowdich, 1821
Order Perissodactyla Owen, 1848
Order Artiodactyla Owen, 1848
Infracohort Euarchontoglires Murphy et al., 2001
Order Lagomorpha Brandt, 1855
Order Rodentia Bowdich, 1821
Order Scandentia Wagner, 1855
Order Dermoptera Illiger, 1811
Order Primates Linnaeus, 1758

See also 
Sarcopterygii
Tetrapoda

References 

Lobe-finned fish
Fish classes